= List of Pakistani administrative units by life expectancy at birth =

== Global Data Lab (2019–2022) ==
This is a list of the Pakistani Administrative Units by life expectancy in 2019–2022, including all provinces and autonomous regions.

region	2019				2019 →2021	2021	2021 →2022	2022				2019 →2022
region	overall	male	female	F Δ M	2019 →2021	overall	2021 →2022	overall	male	female	F Δ M	2019 →2022
Pakistan on average	68.10	64.60	69.10	4.50	0.66	66.10	0.33	66.43	64.13	68.92	4.79	0.33
FATA	73.32	70.90	77.33	6.43	0.73	72.59	0.10	72.49	77.13	70.39	6.74	0.83
Islamabad	74.20	68.55	74.25	5.70	0.69	70.14	0.35	70.49	68.07	74.06	5.99	0.34
Khyber Pakhtunkhwa	68.62	66.43	71.47	5.07	0.67	67.95	0.34	68.29	65.95	71.28	5.33	0.33
Sindh	66.88	64.71	69.25	4.54	0.66	66.22	0.33	66.55	64.25	69.07	4.82	0.33
Balochistan	66.65	64.49	68.96	4.47	0.66	65.99	0.38	66.32	64.03	68.78	4.75	0.33
AJK	66.36	63.70	71.59	7.89	1.30	65.06	0.38	65.72	62.79	71.22	8.43	0.64
Punjab	65.83	63.67	67.91	4.24	0.65	65.18	0.38	65.51	63.22	67.74	4.52	0.32
